North Antrim is a parliamentary constituency in the United Kingdom House of Commons. The current MP is Ian Paisley Jr of the DUP.

Boundaries

1950–1974: The Boroughs of Ballymena and Larne, the Urban Districts of Ballycastle, Ballymoney, and Portrush, the Rural Districts of Ballycastle, Ballymena, and Ballymoney, and in the Rural District of Larne the electoral divisions of Ardclinis, Ballycor, Carncastle, Glenarm North, Glenarm South, Glencloy, and Kilwaughter.

1974–1983: The Boroughs of Ballymena, Carrickfergus, and Larne, the Urban Districts of Ballycastle, Ballymoney, Portrush, and Whitehead, the Rural Districts of Ballycastle, Ballymena, and Ballymoney, and in the Rural District of Larne the electoral divisions of Ardclinis, Ballycor, Carncastle, Eden, Glenarm North, Glenarm South, Glencloy, Glynn, Islandmagee North, Islandmagee South, Kilwaughter, Middle Division, Raloo, and Templecorran.

1983–2010: The District of Ballymena, the District of Ballymoney, and the District of Moyle.

2010–present: The District of Ballymena, the District of Ballymoney, and the District of Moyle wards of Armoy, Ballylough, Bushmills, Bonamargy and Rathlin, Carnmoon, Dalriada, Dunseverick, Glenshesk, Glentaisie, Kinbane, Knocklayd, Moss Side, and Moyarget.

North Antrim has always been a county constituency comprising the northern part of County Antrim in the north-east of Northern Ireland. It has the sea to the north and east and parts of the border with County Londonderry to the west – the County Antrim town of Portrush is included in the East Londonderry constituency (although it was in this seat until 1983).

From 1885, this constituency was one of four county divisions carved out of the former constituency of Antrim. It comprised the baronies of Cary, Dunluce Lower, Dunluce Upper and Kilconway and returned one Member of Parliament from 1885 until 1922, when it was merged into a new Antrim constituency.

North Antrim was re-created in 1950 when the old Antrim two MP constituency was abolished as part of the final move to single member seats.

The constituency is largely rural. Amongst the features within its boundaries are Rathlin Island and Giant's Causeway.

The Boundary Commission initially proposed alterations for the boundaries of North Antrim prior to the 2010 general election. It was proposed to transfer Ballycastle and the Glens, including Rathlin Island, in Moyle to East Antrim and rename that seat Antrim Coast & Glens. However that proposal raised many questions, with some arguing that the Glens have no natural ties to Jordanstown. Following consultation and revision, the constituency alterations were passed through the Northern Ireland Parliamentary Constituencies Order.

History
North Antrim is an overwhelmingly unionist seat. It first existed from 1885 to 1922.  From 1886 to 1974 the Conservative and Unionist members of the United Kingdom House of Commons formed a single Parliamentary party.

Unusually for Ireland, the Liberal Party retained significant strength in this constituency after the split over Home Rule in 1886. The Irish Parliamentary Party never contested the seat.

In 1906 the constituency was won by a Russellite Unionist, at least somewhat linked to the Liberal Party. Although the Unionists regained the seat when the sitting MP retired, the constituency was one of very few Unionist/Liberal marginals in Ireland at both 1910 elections.

A victory for the Unionist candidate in 1918 by 9,621 votes to Sinn Féin's 2,673 votes demonstrated the strength of the unionist support in the area.

In 1922, the constituency reverted to being part of the two member Antrim seat (as it had been before 1885). North Antrim was re-created in 1950 as a larger seat than it had been in its first incarnation. County Antrim, excluding the parts in the Belfast constituencies, was split into two divisions instead of four as previously. The 1950 North Antrim was comparable to the North and Mid Antrim divisions which had existed from 1885 to 1922.

Since 1950 the Westminster elections have been relatively uncompetitive. In 1951, it was one of the last four seats to be uncontested in a UK general election.  More recently, one man repeatedly won by a large majority: Ian Paisley was first elected as a Protestant Unionist Party candidate in the 1970 general election after narrowly defeating sitting member Henry Clark. The following year that party changed to the Democratic Unionist Party and Paisley easily held the seat for 40 years until his retirement in 2010. This is the longest continuous period for which the current holding party has held any Northern Irish seat. In elections at all levels, the DUP have frequently had their highest share of the vote in North Antrim and have rarely been seriously challenged.

In March 2010 Ian Paisley announced that he would step down at the 2010 general election. His son Ian Paisley Jr was selected by the DUP to replace him as candidate. Former DUP MEP Jim Allister announced that he would contest the constituency for the Traditional Unionist Voice. Paisley Jr was elected with a significantly reduced majority.

In July 2018 a recall petition was launched following a critical report into Paisley Jr's conduct in respect to an undeclared trip to Sri Lanka. The petition narrowly failed.

Members of Parliament 
The Member of Parliament since the 2010 general election is Ian Paisley Jr of the DUP. He succeeded his father, the Rev. Dr. Ian Paisley, who was initially elected in the 1970 general election as a member of the Protestant Unionist Party, which became the DUP the following year.

North Antrim has had comparatively few MPs in its lifetime compared to other parliamentary constituencies. Sir Hugh O'Neill had sat for one of the predecessor seats of Mid Antrim between 1915 and 1922 and Antrim between 1922 until 1950, making this one of the few seats where four individuals between them represented the seat continuously over a period of ninety years.

Elections

Elections in the 1880s 

 Caused by MacNaghten being appointed Lord of Appeal.

Elections in the 1890s

Elections in the 1900s

Elections in the 1910s

Elections in the 1950s

Elections in the 1960s

Elections in the 1970s

Elections in the 1980s

Elections in the 1990s

Elections in the 2000s

Elections in the 2010s

See also 
 List of parliamentary constituencies in Northern Ireland

References

Further reading
F. W. S. Craig, British Parliamentary Election Results 1950 – 1970

External links 
Politics Resources (Election results from 1922 onwards)
Electoral Calculus (Election results from 1955 onwards)
2017 Election House Of Commons Library 2017 Election report
A Vision Of Britain Through Time (Constituency elector numbers)
Guardian Unlimited Politics (Election results from 1992 to the present)
Politicsresources.net - Official Web Site ✔ (Election results from 1951 to the present)

Politics of County Antrim
Westminster Parliamentary constituencies in Northern Ireland
Constituencies of the Parliament of the United Kingdom established in 1885
Constituencies of the Parliament of the United Kingdom disestablished in 1922
Constituencies of the Parliament of the United Kingdom established in 1950
1885 establishments in Ireland
1950 establishments in Northern Ireland